Marymount College is an independent Roman Catholic co-educational secondary school located at Burleigh Waters on the Gold Coast in Queensland, Australia. It was established in 1968 by Frank Shine. Marymount College is the largest Catholic High School (7-12 only) and the furtherest south non-Government high school on the Queensland coastline.

History 

Marymount College opened in 1968 as a parish secondary school for girls operated by the Missionary Franciscan Sisters of the Immaculate Conception, with sixteen students and two staff. The school complex (110 acres of land with classrooms, a convent, and a chapel) at Burleigh Waters cost $146,000. The Franciscan nuns left the convent and school in 1994, and the convent was demolished in 2013.

School expansion started almost immediately, with the first extension being built in 1971 and the first new building in 1974. The school has since seen extensive expansion, with new buildings or wings being added every few years. The most recent addition was in 2015, giving the current campus complex.

In 1972 the school became co-educational and enrolment reached 120. The first senior class was in 1974, and by 1982 enrolment had  reached 620. In 1999, 905 students were enrolled, and 1110 students in 2010. A Year 8 classroom building was added in 1987, and Year 7 was added in 2015.

As of 2022, Marymount College now has over 1250 students and 100 staff. Major re-developments of the College took place in 2022 in vision of a new Masterplan.

Facilities 

Performing & Visual Arts: Amphitheatre, Art Studios, Audio Visual Room, Dance Studio, Drama Workshops, Editing Suite, Media Centre, Music Rooms, Music Tuition Rooms, Recording Studio, Theatrette.

Academic Facilities: Agricultural Greenhouse, Agricultural Shed, Air-conditioned Classrooms, Hospitality Kitchens, Hospitality Dining Room, Industrial Design & Technology Block, Library & Resource Centre, Technology Building, Science Laboratories, Sewing & Textiles Room

Student Support Facilities: Canteen & Vending Machine, Careers & Vocational Education Centre, Counsellors Rooms, IT Service Desk, Learning Support & Enhancement Centre, Responsible Thinking Classroom, Secured Undercover Bike Storage, Student Administration Office, Student Lockers, Uniform Shop, Book Shop & Book Hire.

Sporting Facilities: AFL Fields, Basketball Courts, Boats (Aluminium), Cricket Pitch, Martin Doyle Centre, Gym, Netball Courts, Tennis Courts, Rugby League Fields, Soccer Fields, Swimming Pool.

Curriculum

Senior subjects

The Arts: Dance, Certificate III in Dance, Drama, Film television and new Media, Music, Music extension, Visual art, Visual Art in Practice
Business: Accounting, Business Management, Certificate II in Business, Diploma of Business, Economics
English: English, English Communication
Home economics, hospitality and child care: Certificate III in Early Childhood Education and Care, Hospitality Studies, Home Economics, Certificate II in Kitchen Operations, Certificate III in Hospitality
Humanities: Ancient History, Modern History, Geography, Legal Studies
Technologies: Information Processing and Technology, Information Technology Systems, Certificate II in Information, Digital Media and Television, Certificate I in Construction, Certificate II in Electrotechnology, Certificate II in Engineering, Graphics, Technology Studies
Languages: French, Japanese
Mathematics: Mathematics A, Mathematics B, Mathematics C, Prevocational Mathematics, Philosophy and Reason
Physical education: Physical Education, Cert II in Sports and Recreation/Cert III Fitness
Religion: Religion and Ethics, Study of Religion
Science: Agricultural Science, Biology, Chemistry, Marine Science, Marine & Aquatic Practices, Physics

Past principals

Notable alumni

 Carl Barron, comedian
 Holly Brisley, actress
 Brittany Broben, diver
 Karina Brown, women's rugby league player
 Jacob Clear, canoeist
 Xavier Coates, Queensland State of Origin Player
 Shannon Fentiman, politician
 Jarred Gillett, football referee
 David Hale, Australian rules football player
 Daniel Kowalski, swimmer
 Ryan Napoleon, swimmer
 Paul O'Brien, actor
 Andrew Raines, Australian rules football player
 Ken Wallace, kayaker
 Ellie Beer, 400m athlete

See also

 List of schools in Gold Coast, Queensland
 Catholic education in Australia

References

Educational institutions established in 1968
Schools on the Gold Coast, Queensland
Catholic secondary schools in Queensland
Burleigh Heads, Queensland
1968 establishments in Australia